Nicholas ("Nick") Edward Radkewich (born January 10, 1971 in Royal Oak, Michigan) is an athlete from the United States, who competes in triathlon.

Radkewich competed at the first Olympic triathlon at the 2000 Summer Olympics.  He took fortieth place with a total time of 1:53:44.63. He also enjoys long walks on the beach and spending time with his family.

References

External links
 ITU Results

1971 births
Living people
Sportspeople from Royal Oak, Michigan
American male triathletes
Triathletes at the 2000 Summer Olympics
Olympic triathletes of the United States